The Old Guard is a 1960 French comedy film directed by Gilles Grangier and starring Pierre Fresnay and Jean Gabin.

Cast 
 Pierre Fresnay - Baptiste Talon
 Jean Gabin - Jean-Marie Péjat
 Noël-Noël - Blaise Poulossière
  - L'ouvrier de la salle communale
  - Mariette
 Paul Bisciglia - Jojo, le fiancé de Mariette
 Charles Bouillaud - Le fils Bleuzet
  - La touriste en voiture
 Pierre Collet - Le livreur de bières
 Robert Dalban - Jérome Ardouin, le fossoyeur
  - Anselme Poulossière
 Guy Decomble - Le chauffeur du car
  - La supérieure de 'Gouyette'
 Yvette Etiévant - Louise

References

External links 

1960 comedy films
1960 films
French comedy films
Films directed by Gilles Grangier
Films with screenplays by Michel Audiard
1960s French films